Jordan Marshall (born 10 May 1993) is an English footballer who plays as a forward. He made his debut in the Football League for Darlington in April 2010 as a 16-year-old. Since then he has played non-league football for a number of Northern League clubs.

Darlington
Marshall was born in Gateshead, and joined Darlington on a youth contract in 2009. He made his first-team debut at the age of 16 on 27 April 2010becoming the 54th player used that seasonreplacing Nathan Mulligan in the 72nd minute as Darlington lost 5–0 at home to Notts County, a result which confirmed County as champions of Football League Two. He made his third and final first-team appearance for financially desperate Darlington eleven days later in their last match before relegation from the Football League, a 2–0 defeat at home to Dagenham & Redbridge.

In 2010–11, he played for Darlington's youth team in their run to the final of the Youth Alliance League Cup, but did not play in the final itself, which Darlington lost on penalties to Wycombe Wanderers' youth team. He was released at the end of the season.

Non-league football
After a trial with Whitby Town, Marshall played for Gateshead reserves during the 2011–12 season, while continuing his education at Gateshead College. He featured for them in the final of the Durham Challenge Cup on 6 April 2012, a 3–0 defeat to Spennymoor Town.

During the 2012–13 season, Marshall played for Northern League sides Norton & Stockton Ancients, Billingham Synthonia, Sunderland RCA, Newcastle Benfield and Team Northumbria. He signed for Marske United from Sunderland RCA in January 2014.

References

External links
 

1993 births
Footballers from Gateshead
Living people
English footballers
Association football forwards
Darlington F.C. players
Gateshead F.C. players
Norton & Stockton Ancients F.C. players
Billingham Synthonia F.C. players
Sunderland Ryhope Community Association F.C. players
Newcastle Benfield F.C. players
Team Northumbria F.C. players
Marske United F.C. players
English Football League players
Northern Football League players